Eleutherodactylus marnockii, the cliff chirping frog, is a small eleutherodactylid frog found in central and western Texas, the United States, and in Coahuila, northern Mexico. It is also known as the cliff frog and Marnock's frog.

Description
They have greenish ground color with brown mottling, often with banding on the rear legs. They have somewhat flattened bodies which allow them to hide in rock crevices.

Behavior and habitat
Cliff chirping frogs are nocturnal and live most of their lives on limestone rock faces. Like most frogs, they will hop, but they are also capable of crawling, which aids them in hiding in rock crevices.

Reproduction
Breeding occurs year-round, except at the coldest times of the winter, but generally peaks during the rainy season in April and May. Females can lay up to three clutches of eggs a year, in a moist substrate of leaf litter or soil.

References

marnockii
Amphibians of Mexico
Amphibians of the United States
Amphibians described in 1878
Taxa named by Edward Drinker Cope